Villiers-le-Sec may refer to the following communes in France:

Villiers-le-Sec, Calvados, in the Calvados département 
Villiers-le-Sec, Haute-Marne, in the Haute-Marne département
Villiers-le-Sec, Nièvre, in the Nièvre département 
Villiers-le-Sec, Val-d'Oise, in the Val-d'Oise département

See also

Villers-le-Sec (disambiguation)